Piotr Stokowiec (born 25 May 1972) is a Polish football manager and former player.

On 5 March 2018, he became the manager of Lechia Gdańsk.

On 21 December 2021, he returned to Zagłębie Lubin, signing a two-and-a-half-year contract with his former club. On 8 November 2022, following five straight league defeats and getting eliminated from the Polish Cup in the round of 32, he was sacked.

Honours

Manager
Lechia Gdańsk
Polish Cup: 2018–19
Polish Super Cup : 2019

References

External links
 
 

1972 births
Living people
Sportspeople from Kielce
Polish footballers
Association football midfielders
Korona Kielce players
Polonia Warsaw players
Świt Nowy Dwór Mazowiecki players
KSZO Ostrowiec Świętokrzyski players
Śląsk Wrocław players
Dyskobolia Grodzisk Wielkopolski players
Akademisk Boldklub players
Notodden FK players
Wigry Suwałki players
Ekstraklasa players
I liga players
III liga players
Polish football managers
Polonia Warsaw managers
Jagiellonia Białystok managers
Zagłębie Lubin managers
Lechia Gdańsk managers
Wigry Suwałki managers
Ekstraklasa managers
I liga managers
Polish expatriate footballers
Expatriate men's footballers in Denmark
Expatriate footballers in Norway
Polish expatriate sportspeople in Denmark
Polish expatriate sportspeople in Norway